Wojciech Truchan (born 15 April 1948) is a Polish biathlete. He competed in the 20 km individual event at the 1976 Winter Olympics.

References

1948 births
Living people
Polish male biathletes
Olympic biathletes of Poland
Biathletes at the 1976 Winter Olympics
People from Tatra County